Sea Dog Brewing Company is a brewery in Bangor, Maine, U.S. Sea Dog was founded by Pete Camplin, Sr. in 1993. Initially, the company comprised a 240-seat brewpub and a small kegging brewery, located in Camden, Maine. In 1995, Sea Dog moved to a new facility, comprising a 540-seat restaurant and brewpub on the banks of the Penobscot River in Bangor. The company is run under the joint ownership of Alan Pugsley and Fred Forsley, who are also the owners of the Shipyard Brewing Company, located in Portland, Maine.

The company also operates brewpubs in Topsham; South Portland, Maine; Camden, Maine; Treasure Island; Orlando, Exeter and North Conway. The Topsham brewpub is located inside the old Pejepscot Paper Company, a historic mill building near the Frank J. Wood Bridge between Topsham and Brunswick, and has a patio overlooking the Androscoggin River that is open during the summer months. 

Sea Dog's beers are formulated and brewed in a traditional style using imported English two-row malted barley for ales and imported German hops and grains for lagers. Fermentation uses a British top-fermenting yeast in open fermenters to create balanced and fruity flavored ales with a crisp finish. Sea Dog claims to be one of the few craft breweries in New England brewing both traditional ales and lagers.

See also
List of Maine breweries

References

External links

knox.villagesoup.com
bangordailynews.com

Beer brewing companies based in Maine
Restaurants in Maine
Food and drink companies established in 1993
Restaurants established in 1995
Companies based in Bangor, Maine
Tourist attractions in Penobscot County, Maine